Hess Village is a pedestrianized area in the downtown of Hamilton, Ontario, Canada. Its streets, in contrast to other areas in Hamilton, are quite thin and restrict vehicle access. It is located between Main and King Street, and a block north west of city hall. It is home to various amenities and shops, notably nightclubs, bars, and historic buildings. It is named after Hess Street, a north-south Lower City collector street that travels through the centre of the area.

History
Hess Street is named after Peter Hess, a farmer and landowner. Peter Street in Hamilton is also named after him, as well, Caroline Street was named after one of his daughters.

Landmarks

Note: Listing of Landmarks from North to South.
Canadian National Railway Yard
Hess Street Elementary School
Sir John A. Macdonald Secondary School
Ohav Zedeck Synagogue (Hess Street Synagogue)
Hess Village
55 Hess (Apartments)
Bruce Trail
Niagara Escarpment (mountain)

Communities
Note: Listing of neighbourhoods from North to South 
Central - The financial center of Hamilton, Ontario
Durand

See also
Niagara Escarpment Commission

References

MapArt Golden Horseshoe Atlas - Page 647 - Grids F11, G11, H11, J11

External links
Hess Village: Official web site - Not updated since 2005??
Durand neighbourhood Association
Bruce Trail Association
Hikes on the Bruce Trail
Google Maps: Hess Street (Hybrid)

Roads in Hamilton, Ontario